Bolette Puggaard may refer to:

People
 Bolette Puggaardm née Hage (1798-), Danish painter
 Bolette Hartmann, née Puggaard, wife of Emil Hartmann

Other
 Bolette Puggaard (ship), brig owned by Hans Puggaard & Co.